Cameron Gharaee is an American actor known for his role as Ahmed Al-Fayeed on the FX series Tyrant. In 2013, he portrayed the role of Stillman Frank in a multi-episode arc of the HBO series The Newsroom.

Early life
Gharaee was raised in Brandon, Mississippi, a suburb of Jackson, to parents of Iranian and Native American descent. He received a full scholarship to attend Mississippi College, but dropped out at age 19 to pursue his acting career.

Filmography

Television

References

External links
 
 

Living people
American male television actors
Male actors from Mississippi
21st-century American male actors
Mississippi College alumni
People from Brandon, Mississippi
Year of birth missing (living people)